The flageolet is a woodwind instrument and a member of the fipple flute family which includes recorders and tin whistles. Its invention was erroneously ascribed to the 16th-century Sieur Juvigny in 1581. There are two basic forms of the instrument: the French, having four finger holes on the front and two thumb holes on the back; and the English, having six finger holes on the front and sometimes a single thumb hole on the back. The latter was developed by English instrument maker William Bainbridge, resulting in the "improved English flageolet" in 1803. There are also double and triple flageolets, having two or three bodies that allowed for a drone and countermelody. Flageolets were made until the 19th century.

Flageolets have varied greatly during the last 400 years. The first flageolets were called "French flageolets", and have four tone-holes on the front and two on the back. This instrument was played by Hector Berlioz, Frédéric Chalon, Samuel Pepys, and Robert Louis Stevenson.  Henry Purcell and George Frideric Handel both wrote pieces for it. An early collection of manuscript Lessons for the Flajolet, dating from about 1676, is preserved in the British Library.

Small versions of this instrument, called bird flageolets, were also made and were used for teaching birds to sing. These tiny flageolets have, like the French flageolet, four finger holes on the front and two thumb holes on the back.

The number of keys on French flageolets ranges from none to seven, the exception being the Boehm system French flageolet made by Buffet Crampon which had thirteen keys. The arrangement of the tone holes on the flageolet yields a scale different from that on the whistle or recorder. Whereas the whistle's basic scale is D-E-F#-G-A-B-C#-d, the flageolet's basic scale is D-E-F-G-A-B-C-d. Cross-fingerings and keys are required to fill in the gaps.

In the late 18th and early 19th centuries, certain English instrument makers started to make flageolets with six finger-holes on the front. These instruments are called "English flageolets" and were eventually produced in metal as tin whistles. The keys number between none and six. Some were produced with changeable top joints which allowed the flageolet to be played as a flute or fife.

An English maker, William Bainbridge, in around 1810 patented a double flageolet which consisted of two English flageolets joined together so that the player could harmonise the tunes that he played. He also produced a triple flageolet which added a third, drone pipe which was fingered in a similar way to an ocarina.

The flageolet was eventually entirely replaced by the tin whistle and is rarely played today. However, it is a very easy instrument to play and the tone is soft and gentle. It has a range of about two octaves.

The flageolet is composed of several parts: the ivory beak serves as the instrument's mouthpiece; the windway is a gradually expanding part that leads to the barrel. The barrel contains the fipple and together they form the wind channel which focusses the stream of air across the window and onto the labium (lip) where the stream is split, giving rise to a musical sound. Finally, there is the body (or bodies, in a double or triple flageolet) which contains the finger holes and keys. The beak, windway and barrel do not contribute to sound production and the instrument can be played if these parts are missing.

See also
 Three-hole pipe
 Shvi

References

External links
 flageolets.com — a site devoted to the flageolet
 leflageoletfrancais.com — a French-language blog devoted to the French flageolet (original URL is dead)

Fipple flutes
French musical instruments
English musical instruments